Hobeika (in Arabic حبيقة) is an Arabic surname. It may refer to:

Elie Hobeika (1956–2002), Lebanese Phalangist and Lebanese Forces commander during the Lebanese Civil War, and former MP. Assassinated.
Georges Hobeika (born 1962), Lebanese fashion designer
Mansour Hobeika (1941–2014), Lebanese Maronite bishop
Arabic-language surnames

Surnames of Lebanese origin